The 1951 edition of Mitropa Cup was unofficial and only for this tournament was named Zentropa Cup. The tournament crushed by the contemporary and most prestigious Latin Cup and Rio Cup, which eluded the national champions club, was won by the Austrians of Rapid Wien.

Participants

Semi-finals
July 3, 1951, Praterstadion, Vienna

|}

3rd place game
July 5, 1951, Praterstadion, Vienna

|}

Final
July 5, 1951, Praterstadion, Vienna

|}

See also
1955–56 European Cup

External links

1951
1950–51 in European football
1950–51 in Italian football
1950–51 in Yugoslav football
1950–51 in Austrian football